Selema Sione (born 18 July 1982)  is a Wallisian athlete who has represented Wallis and Futuna at the Pacific Games.

Sione has previously won gold and silver medals in the javelin and shot put in the French championships.

At the 2003 Pacific Games in Suva she won silver in the shot put and javelin.

References

Living people
1982 births
Wallis and Futuna shot putters
Wallis and Futuna javelin throwers